The 2018 Samarkand Challenger was a professional tennis tournament played on clay courts. It was the 22nd edition of the tournament which was part of the 2018 ATP Challenger Tour. It took place in Samarkand, Uzbekistan between 14 and 19 May 2018.

Singles main-draw entrants

Seeds

 1 Rankings are as of May 7, 2018.

Other entrants
The following players received wildcards into the singles main draw:
  Farrukh Dustov
  Sanjar Fayziev
  Denis Istomin
  Jurabek Karimov

The following player received entry into the singles main draw as a special exempt:
  Sergey Betov

The following players received entry from the qualifying draw:
  Sriram Balaji
  Sergey Fomin
  Manuel Peña López
  Roman Safiullin

Champions

Singles

 Luca Vanni def.  Mario Vilella Martínez 6–4, 6–4.

Doubles

 Sriram Balaji /  Vishnu Vardhan def.  Mikhail Elgin /  Denis Istomin, walkover.

References

2018 ATP Challenger Tour
2018
2018 in Uzbekistani sport
May 2018 sports events in Asia